Sŏhŭng County is a county in North Hwanghae province, North Korea.

Administrative divisions
Sŏhŭng county is divided into 1 ŭp (town) and 20 ri (villages):

Transportation
Sŏhŭng county is served by the P'yŏngbu line of the Korean State Railway.

Counties of North Hwanghae